Walce da Silva Costa Filho (born 2 February 1999), commonly known as Walce, is a Brazilian professional footballer who plays for Juventude, on loan from São Paulo FC as a centre-back.

Career statistics

Club

Notes

References

1999 births
Living people
Brazilian footballers
Brazil youth international footballers
Association football defenders
Campeonato Brasileiro Série A players
Campeonato Brasileiro Série B players
São Paulo FC players
Esporte Clube Juventude players